Karl Frenademez (born 11 March 1970) is an Italian snowboarder. He competed in the men's giant slalom event at the 1998 Winter Olympics.

References

External links
 

1970 births
Living people
Italian male snowboarders
Olympic snowboarders of Italy
Snowboarders at the 1998 Winter Olympics
Sportspeople from the Province of Lecce
20th-century Italian people